Michael Halberstam may refer to:

 Michael J. Halberstam (1932–1980), American cardiologist and author
 Michael W. Halberstam, American stage actor and director